Michael Keith Valentine "Mike" Wheeler (14 February 1935 15 January 2020) was a British athlete who competed in the 440 yards / 400 metres track events.

He competed for Great Britain in the 1956 Summer Olympics held in Melbourne, Australia, where he won the bronze medal in the 4 × 400 metres relay with his teammates Peter Higgins, John Salisbury, and Derek Johnson.

In the 440 yards event, Wheeler was the English public schools record holder in 1953, the joint English Native record holder in 1955, and the British over 30s and AAA Champion in 1956. He had eleven international appearances from 1955 to 1956. He retired from athletics in 1966.

References

External links 
 Profile at the British Olympic Association
 Profile at Sports-Reference.com

British male sprinters
Olympic bronze medallists for Great Britain
Athletes (track and field) at the 1956 Summer Olympics
1935 births
2020 deaths
Medalists at the 1956 Summer Olympics
Olympic bronze medalists in athletics (track and field)